The 2007 Qatar Open, known as the 2007 Qatar ExxonMobil Open, for sponsorship reasons, was  men's ATP Tour tennis tournament held in Doha, Qatar from 1 January until 6 January 2007.

The tournament saw second-seeded Ivan Ljubičić claim his first of two tournaments this year, and also saw him temporarily lead the ATP race.

Finals

Singles

 Ivan Ljubičić defeated  Andy Murray, 6–4, 6–4

Doubles

 Mikhail Youzhny /  Nenad Zimonjić defeated  Martin Damm /  Leander Paes, 6–1, 7–6(7–3)

External links 
 Qatar Tennis Federation official site
 Official website for Qatar ExxonMobil Open 2007
 Association of Tennis Professional (ATP) tournament profile